Atterberg may refer to:
 Albert Atterberg (1846–1916), Swedish chemist and agricultural scientist
 Kurt Atterberg (1887–1974), Swedish composer and engineer
 Atterberg limits